Torsten Hiekmann (born March 17, 1980 in Berlin) is a former German professional road bicycle racer.

Major results

1997
 1st  Time trial, UCI Junior Road World Championships
1999
1st Stage 2 Le Triptyque des Monts et Châteaux
2000
1st Rund um den Henninger Turm Under-23
4th Overall Peace Race 
2002
3rd Overall Hessen Rundfahrt
3rd GP Triberg-Schwarzwald
2003
1st GP Triberg-Schwarzwald
2004
2nd Overall Tour de Luxembourg
3rd Overall Route du Sud
2005
2nd Overall Regio-Tour
2006
1st Stage 5 Regio-Tour

 2nd, National U23 Road Race Championship (1999)
 2nd (1998)
  U19 Cyclo-Cross Champion (1997)
  U17 Cyclo-Cross Champion (1996)

External links 
Profile at Gerolsteiner official website

1980 births
Living people
German male cyclists
Cyclists from Berlin
21st-century German people